Odd Fellows' Home or Odd Fellows Home may refer to:

in the United States
(by state then city)
Caldwell Odd Fellow Home for the Aged, Caldwell, Idaho, NRHP-listed
Odd Fellows' Home (Worcester, Massachusetts), NRHP-listed
Odd Fellows' Home for Orphans, Indigent and Aged, Springfield, Ohio, NRHP-listed
Carmen IOOF Home, Carmen, Oklahoma, NRHP-listed
Oklahoma Odd Fellows Home at Checotah, Checotah, Oklahoma, NRHP-listed
IOOF Relief Home, Park City, Utah, NRHP-listed

See also
List of Odd Fellows buildings
Odd Fellows Hall (disambiguation)